Marie Baker (born 6 February 1954) is an Irish judge who has served as a Judge of the Supreme Court of Ireland since December 2019. She previously served as a Judge of the High Court from 2014 to 2018 and a Judge of the Court of Appeal from 2018 to 2019.

Early career
Baker was educated at University College Cork, where she received BA, MA and BCL degrees. She later attended and studied at the King's Inns and became a barrister in 1984 and a senior counsel in 2004. Her practice predominantly focused on commercial law, conveyancing, family law and litigation. She specialised on cases involving the National Asset Management Agency towards the end of her career as a barrister. She was a member of the Study Group on Pre-nuptial Agreements, which reported to the Minister for Justice, Equality and Law Reform in 2007. She has previously acted as a part-time commissioner of the Law Reform Commission and lectured in several areas of law.

Judicial career

High Court
She was appointed to the High Court in January 2014. She sat in on a three-judge division of the High Court in December 2014 in the case of PP v. HSE.

Court of Appeal
Baker was elevated to the Court of Appeal in June 2018. She holds a statutory position as the designated judge for the purpose of two acts: the Interception of Postal Packets and Telecommunications Messages (Regulation) Act 1993 and the Communications (Retention of Data) Act 2011. In this role she produces an annual report for the Oireachtas. She also communicates with the Taoiseach in relation to privacy and interception of communications issues.

Supreme Court
She was appointed to the Supreme Court in December 2019. Her appointment followed the retirement of Susan Denham in 2018. Her first sitting on the court occurred on 16 January 2020, marking the first time four women had sat together on the Supreme Court.

Baker is the Assigned Judge for the Irish courts for the purpose of supervising the use of personal data while courts act in their judicial capacity.

References

Living people
High Court judges (Ireland)
Alumni of University College Cork
1954 births
21st-century Irish judges
20th-century Irish lawyers
Irish women judges
Judges of the Court of Appeal (Ireland)
Alumni of King's Inns
Judges of the Supreme Court of Ireland
21st-century women judges